A Cosmic Christmas is a 1977 American-Canadian Christmas animated television special, premiering on CBC in Canada and in syndication in the United States on 4 December 1977. A Cosmic Christmas is the first special in the 1977 to 1980 series of television specials produced by Nelvana Ltd. and was also the first animated production from the studio. It premiered on 4 December 1977 on CBC Television. It was submitted for the Best Animated Short Academy Award.

Plot

Three aliens from an unknown planet, who bear a strong resemblance to the Biblical Magi, visit Earth to know the true meaning of Christmas. Peter, a young boy, and Lucy, his goose, are the first to encounter them. Unable to find the true meaning of Christmas in town, Peter takes them to his family's house in the woods. While Peter's grandmother tells the aliens about her memories of Christmas, Marvin, one of the town's bullies, steals Lucy. In the chase to rescue Lucy, Marvin falls through the ice in a lake. Peter attempts to rescue him but falls into the lake as well. The townsfolk, who were out searching for the aliens, attempt to save the boys but their human chain is not long enough to reach them. The three aliens, who had sworn not to interfere with events on Earth, decide to help in order to learn the meaning of Christmas. The rescue effort is successful. The townsfolk are quick to condemn Marvin for stealing Lucy, but have a change of heart when they realize that Marvin stole Lucy because he had nothing to eat. Peter offers Marvin and his friends the chance to join them for Christmas dinner and the aliens realize that family and the spirit of forgiveness are the true meaning of Christmas.

Cast
 Joey Davidson	...	Peter
 Martin Lavut	...	Dad, Plutox, Santa Joe
 Richard M. Davidson	...	Lexicon (as Richard Davidson)
 Duncan Regehr	...	Amalthor
 Patricia Moffatt	...	Mom
 Jane Mallett	...	Grandma
 Marvin Goldhar	...	Snerk
 Greg Rogers	...	Marvin
 Chris Wiggins	...	Mayor
 Nick Nichols	...	Townie
 Marian Waldman	...	Townie

Release
The special was later released onto videocassette by Warner Home Video in the early 1980s as part of the Nelvanamation (Volume 1) VHS release. It was later released onto a budget VHS from Diamond Entertainment. Both of these releases are out of print and there are no plans to release it on DVD.

See also
 List of Christmas films

References

External links

1977 television specials
1970s animated television specials
Christmas television specials
Canadian Christmas films
1970s science fiction films
Films directed by Clive A. Smith
Nelvana television specials
Canadian animated television films
Canadian animated science fiction films
1970s Christmas films
Science fiction television specials
1977 films
Alien visitations in fiction
1970s Canadian films
Christmas science fiction films